Abandon All Life is the second full-length studio album by American hardcore punk band Nails. The album was released on 28 March 2013 through Southern Lord Records to positive reviews with an aggregated score of 80/100 on Metacritic.

Track listing

Personnel
Nails
John Gianelli - bass
Taylor Young - drums
Todd Jones - vocals, guitars

Session
Andy Saba - lead guitar

Production
Farron Kerzner - artwork
Kurt Ballou - producer, engineering, mixing
Scott Magrath - layout, design
Brad Boatright - mastering

References 

2013 albums
Albums produced by Kurt Ballou
Southern Lord Records albums
Nails (band) albums